7 A.M. may refer to
A time on the 12-hour clock
7AM, a 2010 album by Teengirl Fantasy
"7 a.m.", a song by The Fireman from the 1998 album Rushes
"7 am", a song by Dirty Vegas from the 2002 album Dirty Vegas
"7 heures du matin", a 1967 song by Jacqueline Taïeb
"7AM", a song by Lil Uzi Vert from the 2015 album Luv Is Rage

Date and time disambiguation pages